Woop or Woops may refer to:

 Woops!, a 1992 American television series
 Woops, a genetically engineered creature in the animated TV series Lilo & Stitch: The Series - see List of Lilo & Stitch: The Series episodes (episode 63)
 WOOP-LP, a radio station from Tennessee, US
 WOOP, former call sign for WXHT, a radio station from Florida, US
 Woop, a pseudonym of guitarist Jeff Warner
 Woop, an obsolete term for a bullfinch
 Woop, a fictional device in The Miraculous Mellops TV series

See also 
 Woop Woop, an Australian colloquial phrase
 Whoops (disambiguation)